(abbreviated UYY; literally "Uyghur New Script") or  (literally "new script", ; ; sometimes falsely rendered as Yengi Yeziķ or Yengi Yezik̡), is a Latin alphabet, with both Uniform Turkic Alphabet and Pinyin influence, used for writing the Uyghur language between 1965 and 1982, primarily by Uyghurs living in China, although the use of  is much more widespread.

It was devised around 1959 and came to replace the Cyrillic-derived alphabet Uyghur Siril Yëziqi which had been used in China after the proclamation of the People's Republic of China in 1949. It is still an official alphabet in China, but after the reintroduction of an Arabic-derived alphabet, in 1982, there has been a huge decline in the use and the majority of Uyghurs today use .
The letters in the UYY (Uyghur New Script) are, in order:

Notes

References 

Uyghur language
Pinyin
Alphabets used by Turkic languages